Malcolm Earl Tann (born August 20, 1978) is an American former professional boxer who competed from 2002 to 2017.

Amateur career
Tann started boxing while serving in the United States Air Force. In 2002 Tann became National Golden Gloves Super Heavyweight Champion with a win over, among others, Nathaniel James.

Professional career
Tann won his first eight bouts, including a bizarre disqualification win over journeyman Clifford Couser (Couser was DQ'd for picking Tann up, slamming him to the mat, then trying to hit him while he was down) in 2003, but was dropped and decisioned by Willie Chapman that same year.  In 2004 he beat Jason Gavern and in 2005 beat Derek Bryant, but later in the year had another defeat, to Domonic Jenkins via decision. During two separate bouts in 2007 televised by ShoBox, Tann was knocked out by heavyweights Chris Arreola and Alexander Dimitrenko.  After the loss to Dimitrenko, Tann retired from boxing.

Professional boxing record

|-
|align="center" colspan=8|25 Wins (14 knockouts, 11 decisions), 6 Losses (4 knockouts, 2 decisions) 
|-
| align="center" style="border-style: none none solid solid; background: #e3e3e3"|Result
| align="center" style="border-style: none none solid solid; background: #e3e3e3"|Record
| align="center" style="border-style: none none solid solid; background: #e3e3e3"|Opponent
| align="center" style="border-style: none none solid solid; background: #e3e3e3"|Type
| align="center" style="border-style: none none solid solid; background: #e3e3e3"|Round
| align="center" style="border-style: none none solid solid; background: #e3e3e3"|Date
| align="center" style="border-style: none none solid solid; background: #e3e3e3"|Location
| align="center" style="border-style: none none solid solid; background: #e3e3e3"|Notes
|-align=center
|Win
|25–6
| align=left |  Ernest Reyna
|KO
|2 (10)
|18 Nov 2017
|style="text-align:left;"| 
|
|-align=center
|Loss
|24–6
| align=left |  Dillian Whyte
|TKO
|3
|19 Aug 2017
|style="text-align:left;"| 
|
|-align=center
|Loss
|24–5
| align=left |  Sergei Kuzmin
|KO
|4
|23 Jun 2017
| align=left |  
|
|- align=center
|Win
|24–4
|align=left| Nick Asberry
|TKO
|3
| 8 Oct 2016
|align=left| 
|align=left|
|-align=center
|Loss
|23–4
|align=left| Alexander Dimitrenko
|TKO
|5
|14 July 2007
|align=left| 
|align=left|WBO Intercontinental Heavyweight Title
|- align=center
|Loss
|23–3
|align=left| Chris Arreola
|TKO
|8
|4 May 2007
|align=left| Pearl Concert Theater Paradise, Nevada, US
|align=left|
|- align=center
|Win
|23–2
|align=left| Wade Lewis
|MD
|6
|9 March 2007
|align=left| 
|
|- align=center
|Win
|22–2
|align=left| Wade Lewis
|UD
|4
|1 December 2006
|align=left| 
|align=left|
|- align=center
|Win
|21–2
|align=left| Joe Stofle
|TKO
|4
|17 November 2006
|align=left| , San Jacinto, California, US
|
|- align=center
|Win
|20–2
|align=left| Sedreck Fields
|UD
|6
|14/09/2006
|align=left| San Jose, California, U.S.
|align=left|
|- align=center
|Win
|19–2
|align=left| Derek Berry
|TKO
|3
|19/07/2006
|align=left| Ontario, California, U.S.
|align=left|
|- align=center
|Win
|18–2
|align=left| Douglas Robertson
|TKO
|2
|08/07/2006
|align=left| Pasadena, Texas, U.S.
|align=left|
|- align=center
|Win
|17–2
|align=left| Shaun Ross
|TKO
|3
|23/03/2006
|align=left| San Jose, California, U.S.
|align=left|
|- align=center
|Loss
|16–2
|align=left| Domonic Jenkins
|UD
|6
|16/09/2005
|align=left| Lemoore, California, U.S.
|align=left|
|- align=center
|Win
|16–1
|align=left| Derek Bryant
|UD
|8
|09/06/2005
|align=left| Temecula, California, U.S.
|align=left|
|- align=center
|Win
|15–1
|align=left| Leroy Childs
|KO
|2
|01/04/2005
|align=left| Lemoore, California, U.S.
|align=left|
|- align=center
|Win
|14–1
|align=left| Innocent Otukwu
|TKO
|2
|10/02/2005
|align=left| Lemoore, California, U.S.
|align=left|
|- align=center
|Win
|13–1
|align=left| Jason Gavern
|UD
|8
|01/10/2004
|align=left| Coachella, California, U.S.
|align=left|
|- align=center
|Win
|12–1
|align=left| Andrew Greeley
|TKO
|2
|19/08/2004
|align=left| Houston, Texas, U.S.
|align=left|
|- align=center
|Win
|11–1
|align=left| Willie Chapman
|UD
|8
|04/06/2004
|align=left| Lincoln City, Oregon, U.S.
|align=left|
|- align=center
|Win
|10–1
|align=left| Wesley Martin
|KO
|1
|14/03/2004
|align=left| Temecula, California, U.S.
|align=left|
|- align=center
|Win
|9–1
|align=left| Rodney McSwain
|UD
|4
|30/01/2004
|align=left| Dallas, Texas, U.S.
|align=left|
|- align=center
|Loss
|8–1
|align=left| Willie Chapman
|SD
|4
|06/11/2003
|align=left| Phoenix, Arizona, U.S.
|align=left|
|- align=center
|Win
|8–0
|align=left| Cliff Couser
|DQ
|1
|11/07/2003
|align=left| Rancho Mirage, California, U.S.
|align=left|
|- align=center
|Win
|7–0
|align=left| Jason Curry
|TKO
|2
|14/06/2003
|align=left| Las Vegas, Nevada, U.S.
|align=left|
|- align=center
|Win
|6–0
|align=left| Wallace McDaniel
|TKO
|1
|18/05/2003
|align=left| Bronx, New York, U.S.
|align=left|
|- align=center
|Win
|5–0
|align=left| Troy Beets
|UD
|4
|15/03/2003
|align=left| Dallas, Texas, U.S.
|align=left|
|- align=center
|Win
|4–0
|align=left| Milan Roldzak
|KO
|1
|25/01/2003
|align=left| Temecula, California, U.S.
|align=left|
|- align=center
|Win
|3–0
|align=left| Harold Rodriguez
|UD
|4
|10/01/2003
|align=left| Uncasville, Connecticut, U.S.
|align=left|
|- align=center
|Win
|2–0
|align=left| Lisandro Ezequiel Diaz
|UD
|4
|13/12/2002
|align=left| Temecula, California, U.S.
|align=left|
|- align=center
|Win
|1–0
|align=left| Jackie Beard
|KO
|1
|03/11/2002
|align=left| Friant, California, U.S.
|align=left|

References

External links 
 

1978 births
Living people
People from Seaboard, North Carolina
Boxers from North Carolina
Heavyweight boxers
National Golden Gloves champions
American male boxers